Helena Kontova (16 November 1955, Prague, Czech Republic) is an art critic and curator based in Milan, Italy, where she has been the editor of Flash Art International since 1979. She is also a co-founder and director, together with Giancarlo Politi, of the Prague Biennale.

Kontova obtained a BA in Art History and History from the Charles University in Prague and went on to study Czech and Italian futurism at the Milan University in 1977.

She participated in numerous symposia and has conducted interviews with artists such as Jeff Koons, Maurizio Cattelan, Marina Abramović, Vanessa Beecroft, Shirin Neshat, Francesco Vezzoli, Gian Marco Montesano and Michelangelo Pistoletto.

In 2004 she founded a private art foundation in Prague, Nadace Prague Biennale. Every two years she directs the Prague Biennale, a Biennal of emerging artists that concentrates each time on different social and geographical aspects.

Bibliography
Flash Art: Two Decades of History, Politi Editore, Milan, 1990.
Mimmo Paladino: Kresby, Oleje, Sochy, Obrezzi & Dones, Milan, 1991.
Mark Kostabi: New Paintings, In Arco, Turin, 1991.
Aperto 93: Emergency, Politi Editore, Milan, 1993.
Audience 0.01: International Video, Politi Editore, Milan, 1994.
Fuori Uso: The Bridges, Politi Editore, Milan, 2000.
Tirana Biennale 1: Escape, Politi Editore, Milan, 2001.
Prague Biennale 1: Peripheries become the Center, Politi Editore, Milan, 2003.
Prague Biennale 2: Expanded Painting, Politi Editore, Milan, 2005.
Prague Biennale 3: Glocal and Outsiders: Connecting Cultures in Central Europe, Politi Editore, Milan, 2007
Prague Biennale 4, Politi Editore, Milan, 2009.
Prague Biennale 5: New Location, New Face, Politi Editore, Milan, 2011.
Prague Biennale 6, Politi Editore, Milan, 2013.

Curatorial activities
1993: Aperto '93, 45th Venice Biennale LINK
1994: Audience 0.01, Trevi Flash Art Museum, Italy / LINK 
1995: Aperto 95, Trevi Flash Art Museum, Italy
1996: Panorama Italiano 1: Arte e Critica Oggi, Trevi Flash Art Museum, Italy 
2000: Fuori Uso: The Bridges, Pescara, Italy.
2001: Tirana Biennale 1, National Gallery, Tirana
2003, 2005, 2007, 2009, 2011, 2013: Prague Biennale

Personal life
She is married to art critic and publisher Giancarlo Politi.

References

External links
Flash Art website 
Prague Biennale website

1955 births
Living people
Czech art critics
Czech editors
Czech women curators
Czech women editors
Czech emigrants to Italy
Italian art critics
Italian art curators
Italian magazine editors
Italian women curators
Italian women editors
Italian women art critics
Czech magazine editors
Women magazine editors
Curators from Milan
Writers from Prague
Charles University alumni